Holger Pohland (born 5 April 1963) is a retired sprint hurdler who competed for East Germany for most of his career. He won medals at the 1986 and 1989 European Indoor Championships, as well as the 1981 European Junior Championships. In addition, he competed at two World Indoor Championships.

His personal bests are 13.40 seconds in the 110 metres hurdles (+2.0 m/s; Tallinn 1986) and 7.63 seconds in the 60 metres hurdles (Karlsruhe 1991).

As was revealed in the documents made public after the German reunification, Pohland was involved in the East German state-sponsored doping system.

References

1963 births
Living people
People from Leipzig (district)
People from Bezirk Leipzig
East German male hurdlers
German male hurdlers
Sportspeople from Saxony
Doping cases in athletics